The thirteenth season of the animated television series Archer premiered on FXX on August 24, 2022.

Synopsis
The Agency has been acquired by the spy conglomerate known as IIA (International Intelligence Agency). As such, Archer and the gang struggle to find their identity performing odd missions for Fabian, the leader of the IIA.

Production 
Archer season 13 was announced on September 28, 2021. This is the first season not to feature Jessica Walter in her role as Malory Archer. Walter died after recording her voice parts for season 12.

Episodes

References

External links 
 
 

2022 American television seasons
Archer (2009 TV series) seasons